A pudding cloth is a culinary utensil similar to a cheesecloth or muslin. It is a reusable alternative to cooking in skins made of animal intestines and became popular in England in the seventeenth century for boiling a wide range of puddings.

Typical uses

Sweet
Prior to the 19th century, the English Christmas pudding was boiled in a pudding cloth. Clootie pudding, a traditional Scottish dessert, is boiled in a pudding cloth. The traditional way to cook jam roly poly is using a pudding cloth.

Savoury
Pease pudding was first made possible at the beginning of the 17th century with the advent of the pudding cloth.

References

External links
The ORIGINAL Christmas Dessert, includes an explanation and example usage of pudding cloth

Kitchenware
Food preparation utensils